William Marcroft (15 July 1822 – 8 September 1894) was a British co-operator, writer, and advocate for producer co-operatives. Marcroft was active in the Oldham Industrial Co-operative Society, the Co-operative Wholesale Society, and the Oldham Building and Manufacturing Company (later renamed to the Sun Mill Company).

Publications by Marcroft

References 

1822 births
1894 deaths
People from Middleton, Greater Manchester
British cooperative organizers